Yury Stanislavovich Biryukov (in , b. March 7, 1948, in Lviv, Ukraine, Soviet Union) is a Russian lawyer and politician.

From June 7, 2000 to July 7, 2006, he was a First Deputy Prosecutor General of Russia. Since 2006 he has been a representative of the executive power branch of Nenets Autonomous Okrug in the Federation Council of Russia.

See also
Three Whales Corruption Scandal

References

Russian lawyers
Russian politicians
1948 births
Living people
Members of the Federation Council of Russia (after 2000)
Ural State Law University alumni